Chahar Barreh (also Romanized as Chahār Barreh, Chahār Bareh, Chahār Borah, and Chehār Būrreh) is a village in Gudarzi Rural District, Oshtorinan District, Borujerd County, Lorestan Province, Iran. At the 2006 census, its population was 1,065, in 290 families.

Notable people
Mahmoud Saremi, Iranian reporter, was born in Chahar Barreh and his killing by the Taliban is marked as Reporters' Day annually by Iran.

References 

Towns and villages in Borujerd County